Parliamentary elections were held in Nauru on 24 September 2022 to elect all 19 members of parliament. All candidates were elected on a non-partisan basis. Following the election, Russ Kun, a member of parliament for Ubenide, was elected president by parliament.

Background 
In the 2019 elections, nearly half of the Parliament members lost their seats, including incumbent President Baron Waqa. Justice minister David Adeang, Waqa's deputy, retained his seat. Adeang was a candidate in the following presidential election; he lost to Lionel Aingimea, who had been an assistant minister.

The Aingimea government implemented some electoral changes. Potential candidates in regularly scheduled general elections were now required to register their intention 270 days before the end of the parliamentary term. These declared candidates would then file nominations during the nomination period. To address public concerns about granting citizenship to foreigners, the government held a constitutional referendum in 2021 which disqualified naturalised citizens and their descendants from running for Parliament.

Aingimea also pushed for strong stances in Pacific affairs. Nauru supported the Micronesia boycott of the Pacific Islands Forum in 2021, which aimed for a Micronesian secretary-general; it also offered to temporarily host a Micronesia secretariat. When University of the South Pacific Vice-Chancellor Pal Ahluwalia was deported from Fiji after investigating university finances, Nauru hosted Ahluwalia at its campus for the term. Aingimea also supported the USP Council's decision to renew Ahluwalia's contract, and commissioned the auditing firm BDO to further pursue the investigation.

Electoral system 
The 19 members of Parliament are elected from eight multi-member constituencies using the Dowdall system, a version of ranked voting; voters rank candidates, with the votes counted as a fraction of one divided by the ranking number (e.g. a candidate ranked second will be scored as ); the candidates with the highest total are elected. There are no political parties, so all candidates run as independents. Informal groups do form in Parliament, but membership is fluid. 

Parliament is elected for a three-year term, but can be dissolved earlier. The government, which comprises the President and the Cabinet, must retain the support of a majority in Parliament.

All citizens aged 20 and older are permitted to cast their ballot; once an individual reaches voting age, they are automatically added to the electoral roll. Voting is compulsory in Nauru; individuals who fail to vote without sufficient reasoning are required to pay a fine. Nauruans who provide proof of illness, are in hospital or are not present in the country on election day are excused. However, Nauruans overseas on the polling day have the option to engage in proxy voting, where an individual assigns someone in Nauru to vote on their behalf. The electoral commission provides a mobile voting service for voters hospitalised or unable to go to polling stations due to incapacity, involving polling staff travelling to these individuals to ensure they can cast their ballot.

Conduct 
On 29 August, Speaker of Parliament Marcus Stephen issued a writ of election for 24 September. 8,054 eligible voters registered for this election. The electoral roll was opened between 1 and 3 September for verification. Nominations were accepted between 4 and 10 September. 77 candidates were nominated to contest the election. The Pacific Islands Forum sent an election monitoring team led by Feue Tipu, the High Commissioner of Tuvalu to New Zealand.

Early voting commenced on 19 September. Due to the COVID-19 pandemic, the electoral commission encouraged polling stations to enforce rigorous hygiene measures. On election day, 24 September, the polling concluded at 6 pm local time.

Results 
The vote count began after the close of polls, and was completed on Monday, 26 September. The speaker and the twelve government members retained their seats. Out of the six opposition members, two were unseated: Milton Dube (Aiwo) and Tawaki Kam (Meneng).

Former presidents Ludwig Scotty and Baron Waqa ran for election, but did not enter Parliament.

Aiwo

Anabar

Anetan

Boe

Buada

Meneng

Ubenide

Yaren

Aftermath 

Following the election, the first session of the 24th parliament was held on 28 September. Russ Kun, a representative for the Ubenide constituency, was the only candidate for president. Former president Marcus Stephen won re-election as speaker of parliament, whilst outgoing president Lionel Aingimea was elected deputy speaker.

Kun and his thirteen-member cabinet were sworn in a ceremony on 29 September. There were six other ministers besides Kun himself, and seven deputy ministers (which included the two new members). Both heads of resident missions, from Australia and Taiwan, were in attendance. The visiting New Zealand high commissioner met with Kun to offer congratulations, and the non-resident European Union ambassador to the Pacific congratulated him on Twitter.

References

Parliamentary election
2022 elections in Oceania
2022 parliamentary
Non-partisan elections
September 2022 events in Oceania